Turaniphytum is a genus of Asian plants in the chamomile tribe within the daisy family.

 Species
 Turaniphytum codringtonii (Rech.f.) Podlech - Afghanistan
 Turaniphytum eranthemum (Bunge) Poljakov - Kazakhstan, Uzbekistan, Altai Krai

References

Asteraceae genera
Anthemideae